Lovetown is the third studio album by Australian singer-songwriter Stephen Cummings. The album was released in January 1988 and peaked at number 61 on the Australian Kent Music Report. The album was re-released in 1989 with an altered track list and four bonus tracks. The album is listed in the 100 Best Australian Albums.

Reception
Ian McFarlane said "Lovetown was a very subtle, alluring, personal and mostly acoustic album. It was full of conversational, narrative vignettes from a world where the ironic title Lovetown certainly referred to Melbourne."

In its 1987 yearbook, Rolling Stone Australia said that "Lovetown was as uncluttered, heartfelt and impacting as only the best music can be." adding "The stripped back arrangements placed a strong emphasis on the song, and Cummings' voice. Here the predominantly Cummings/Pendlebury penned tunes stood up to the closest scrutiny. The lyrics on the brilliant 'Everybody Wants to Get to Heaven But Nobody Wants to Die", "She Set Fire to the House' and 'Push It Up All Fall Down' consistently hit the spot as they incisively documented relationships on the skids. These songs were made to be presented in a loose, and traditional format. They had a remarkable, timeless presence."

Track listing 

1989 Re-release

Charts

Release history

References 

1988 albums
Stephen Cummings albums